Morven (sometimes spelled "Moryen") is a rural unincorporated community in northwestern Amelia County just south of the Appomattox River in the U.S. state of Virginia. It lies at the intersection of SR 681 (Clementown Road) and SR 616 (S. Genito Road).

The hamlet was a post village noted as Eanes (or Eenes) Crossroads on some maps in the mid-1800s. By the turn of the 20th century, its post office was listed as Morven. The area is now served by the post office 10 miles southeast at the county seat, Amelia Court House, ZIP code 23002.

On April 5, 1865, during the final days of the Civil War, as General Robert E. Lee and his army continued their westward retreat, Union troops intercepted and destroyed a Confederate wagon train that had just passed through Morven. The engagement was one of the few, if not the only one, to involve Black Confederate troops. The surrender to Ulysses S. Grant took place at Appomattox on April 9, 1865.

Morven School, on Route 616, was among a collection of school properties in Amelia County advertised for sale in the 1960s, after desegregation. Although all the properties advertised were of similar description and most were Rosenwald Schools, it is unclear whether Morven School was itself a Rosenwald. During the early 20th century, the Rosenwald School project constructed thousands of facilities across the South primarily for the education of African American children.

Existing historic structures at Morven include Little Union Baptist Church (pictured), located on Route 681 just north of the crossroads. Haw Branch plantation, 4 miles east, was added to the National Register of Historic Places in 1973.

References

Unincorporated communities in Amelia County, Virginia
Unincorporated communities in Virginia